BPP may refer to:

Education
 BPP Holdings, a holding company based in the United Kingdom
 BPP Law School, a law school based in the United Kingdom and a constituent school of BPP University
 BPP University, a private university based in the United Kingdom

Mathematics 
 Bounded-error probabilistic polynomial time, a class of decision problems in computational complexity theory
 Bin packing problem a problem in computational complexity theory

Medicine
 Biophysical profile, a prenatal ultrasound evaluation of fetal well-being
 BPP (also Brom PP), a medicine used for treatment of upper respiratory tract infection et al., in tablet or other form, with Brompheniramine, Phenylephrine and Phenylpropanolamine as active ingredients.

Places 
 Bang Pa-in Palace, the former Summer Palace of Thai kings.  
 Bandar Puteri Puchong, a township in Puchong, Selangor, Malaysia  
 Beckenham Place Park, a local nature reserve in southeastern London
 Belmont Provincial Park, a provincial park, Prince Edward Island, Canada 
 Bình Phước Province, a province of Vietnam
 Black Patch Park, a park in Smethwick, England 
 Black Pudding Peak, an isolated mountain  Prince Albert Mountains, Victoria Land, Antarctica
 Blomidon Provincial Park, a provincial park in Nova Scotia, Canada. 
 Bloomfield Provincial Park a provincial park, Prince Edward Island, Canada 
 Bogwang Phoenix Park, a ski resort in South Korea 
 Bonnechere Provincial Park, a provincial park on Round Lake, Ontario, Canada
 Bonshaw Provincial Park, a provincial park, Prince Edward Island, Canada 
 Brookvale Provincial Park, a provincial park, Prince Edward Island, Canada
 Brown-Lowery Provincial Park, a provincial park in Alberta, Canada
 Buffaloland Provincial Park, a provincial park, Prince Edward Island, Canada

Politics
 Bavarian People's Party
 Bangon Pilipinas Party,  a political party in the Philippines 
 Bessarabian Peasants' Party
 Bhutan Peoples' Party 
 Bihar People's Party, a political party Bihar state, India  
 Black Panther Party, a black left-wing organization, active from 1966 to 1976 
 Bosnian-Herzegovinian Patriotic Party 
 Botswana People's Party
 British People's Party (disambiguation)
 Brunei People's Party

Technology 
 Bits per pixel, also known as color depth
 Beam parameter product, a measure of laser beam quality
 BeanShell preprocessor
 Breakthrough Propulsion Physics Program, a NASA research project 1996–2002, studying hypothetical spacecraft propulsion

Other 
 B.P.P. album by Ukrainian band Faktychno Sami
 MIT Billion Prices project, real-time inflation estimate from MIT  
 Bali Peace Park, organization to found a Bali Peace Park
 Banco Privado Português, a defunct Portuguese bank, based in Lisbon
 Birmingham Parks Police, Birmingham, United Kingdom, park police 1912-1962
 Brighton Parks Police, Brighton, United Kingdom, park police   
 Bekenntnisbruderschaft St. Peter und Paul, German Lutheran High Church brotherhood
 Bryant Park Project, radio show on NPR
 Buakaw Por. Pramuk, Thai Muay Thaifighter
 Border Patrol Police, the border guard of Thailand
 North American Bird Phenology Program, database on North American bird migration patterns and population
 British protected persons, class of British nationality
 Banca Popolare Pugliese, Italian bank
 Bund Philatelistischer Prüfer, German philatelic expertising guild
 Bavarian Political Police, forerunner of the Gestapo in Bavaria (1933–36)